Victor Albert Ernest Joseph Barwick (17 June 1879 – 20 December 1963) was an Australian rules footballer who played for St Kilda in the Victorian Football League (VFL).

Football
Barwick began his early football career in the Tasmanian town of Queenstown and was noticed for the quality of his play in 1900 in a match against the visiting Fitzroy team from Victoria. Within a few years he ventured to the mainland and in 1903 joined St Kilda. He made his debut in the round six match versus Melbourne.

A strongly built rover, he was good enough to represent the VFL against Western Australia in 1904 and topped St Kilda's goal-kicking in 1909 with 16 goals. Barwick also was club captain for both the 1905 and 1909 seasons. Although he would return to St Kilda briefly in 1913, Barwick finished his career at Brighton in the Victorian Football Association.

He was one of the earlier Tasmanian players to have made a mark in the Victorian Football League and in 2005 he was inducted into his state's Football Hall of Fame.

Notes

References
Holmesby, Russell and Main, Jim (2007). The Encyclopedia of AFL Footballers. 7th ed. Melbourne: Bas Publishing.

External links

1879 births
1963 deaths
Australian rules footballers from Tasmania
Australian Rules footballers: place kick exponents
St Kilda Football Club players
Brighton Football Club players
Tasmanian Football Hall of Fame inductees